Mikhail Konstantinovich Kalatozov (28 December 1903 – 26 March 1973), born Mikheil Kalatozishvili, was a Soviet film director of Georgian origin who contributed to both Georgian and Russian cinema. He is most well known for his films The Cranes Are Flying and I Am Cuba. In 1969, he was named a People's Artist of the USSR. His film The Cranes Are Flying won the Palme d'Or at the 1958 Cannes Film Festival.

Biography
Kalatozishvili (his surname at birth) was born in Tiflis, Russian Empire. His family belonged to a noble Amirejibi house that traces its history back to the 13th century. One of Mikhail's uncles served as a General in the Imperial Russian Army, another one was among the founders of the Tbilisi State University.

Kalatozov studied economics and changed many professions before starting his film career as an actor and later — as a cinematographer. He directed several documentary films, including Their Kingdom (with Nutsa Gogoberidze, the first Georgian female film director) and Salt for Svanetia (1930).

In 1933 he enrolled to the Russian State Institute of Performing Arts. In 1936 he headed the Kartuli Pilmi film studio, then he was suggested a place at the State Committee for Cinematography. In 1939 he moved to Leningrad to work at the Lenfilm studio as a film director. During World War II he directed several propaganda films and worked as a cultural attaché at the Soviet embassy in the United States.

During the 1950s he directed several other films. His four final features, The Cranes Are Flying (1957), Letter Never Sent (1959), I Am Cuba (1964), and The Red Tent (1969), are among his most famous works. The first three movies are often praised for the masterful camerawork by the Russian cinematographer Sergey Urusevsky. The Cranes Are Flying became one of the leaders of the 1957 Soviet box office (10th place with 28.3 million viewers) and won several international awards, including Palme d'Or at the 1958 Cannes Film Festival. The Red Tent was a joint Soviet-Italian effort and featured an international team of actors, including Peter Finch, Sean Connery, Claudia Cardinale, Hardy Krüger, Nikita Mikhalkov and others. It was nominated for the 1971 Golden Globe Award for Best English-Language Foreign Film. During the 1990s, I Am Cuba was discovered by American film professionals and showed to Martin Scorsese and Francis Ford Coppola, who became so impressed with the production that they advocated the restoration and distribution of the movie that was conducted by Milestone Films. In 1995 it was nominated for the Independent Spirit Award for Best International Film.

Kalatozov was married to Zhanna Valachi, daughter of the Italian consul. They met in Batumi during vacation. In 1929 Zhanna gave a birth to their son Georgy and became a naturalized citizen of the Soviet Union. Georgy followed his father's steps and worked as a cinematographer and film director at the Kartuli Pilmi studio, and so did his grandson — Mikheil Kalatozishvili who also became a successful Russian film director and producer.

Mikhail Kalatozov died in Moscow on March 26, 1973 after his seventh heart attack and was buried at the Novodevichy Cemetery. Mikheil Kalatozishvili founded a non-commercial Mikhail Kalatozov Fund named after his grandfather to help with film preservation and with funding of new movies.

Filmography
1930 Salt for Svanetia; documentary
1931 Nail in the Boot
1939 Courage
1941 Valery Chkalov
1950 Conspiracy of the Doomed
1953 Hostile Whirlwinds
1954 True Friends
1955 The First Echelon
1957 The Cranes Are Flying
1959 Letter Never Sent
1964 I Am Cuba
1969 The Red Tent

References

Literature
 Anna Kalatozishvili, Zaza Japaridze (2012). — Mikhail Kalatozov. — Tbilisi, 270 pages. —  (biography)
 German Kremlev (1964). — Mikhail Kalatozov. — Moscow: Iskusstvo, 244 pages. (biography)
 Cinema: Encyclopedic Dictionary (1987) / Ed.: Sergei Yutkevich. — Moscow: Soviet Encyclopedia, 640 pages.

External links

Kalatozov Mikhail Konstantinovich biography at To Be Remembered (in Russian)

1903 births
1973 deaths
20th-century screenwriters
Film people from Tbilisi
People from Tiflis Governorate
Communist Party of the Soviet Union members
Russian State Institute of Performing Arts alumni
Directors of Palme d'Or winners
People's Artists of Georgia
People's Artists of the USSR
Stalin Prize winners
Recipients of the Order of the Red Banner of Labour
Recipients of the Order of the Red Star
Cultural attachés
Silent film directors
Cinematographers from Georgia (country)
Film directors from Georgia (country)
Screenwriters from Georgia (country)
Soviet cinematographers
Soviet expatriates in the United States
Soviet film directors
Soviet screenwriters
Burials at Novodevichy Cemetery